Horváth is an international, independent management consultancy with over 1,200 employees in locations in Europe, the USA, and other global markets. The Company carries out projects focused on performance management and transformation around the world.

Consulting profile 
Horváth provides management consulting services and carries out projects for international customers around the world. The firm supports companies and top executives with competence in business models, organizational structures, processes and systems to successfully align their organizations for the future throughout the entire organization or at a divisional or a functional level. Horváth is a member of the international Cordence Worldwide consulting network.

History 
The company was founded by university professors Péter Horváth and Erich Zahn, as well as entrepreneur Hans-Georg Winderlich as IFUA Institut für Unternehmensanalysen in October 1981. In the following years, former PhD students of Horváth entered the young company who significantly helped shaping the structure of the advisory group and who later held or still hold important management positions: Bernd Gaiser, Michael Kieninger, Reinhold Mayer, Andreas Renner and Christof Schimank. After the death of Hans-Georg Winderlich and the separation of Erich Zahn in 1989, the company was continued as IFUA Horváth & Partner GmbH. Together with his partners, Péter Horváth encouraged the development of new controlling methods (for example activity-based costing or the target costing approach) in his company. In the mid-1990s, he was involved in introducing the concept of the balanced scorecard in Europe.

In 2000, the company re-organized itself: Horváth AG was founded as a holding company of the Horváth & Partners group and issue-areas, as well as industry expertise were bundled into competence centers. Péter Horváth took over the Chairmanship of the Board. The Board and the Partners are responsible for the management of the holding and its subsidiaries.

In 2006, the company became a member of Cordence Worldwide, an international network of independent consulting companies. In 2008, the company reached 400 employees and the group surmounted 100 million euros in sales for the first time.

With offices in Riyadh (2015), Dubai (2018), Atlanta (2019), Rome (2021) and Copenhagen (2022) Horváth is currently represented with 13 offices in 9 countries and employs more than 1,200 people. With shortening of the brand name from Horváth & Partners to Horváth, the brand identity changed in April 2021 with the introduction of the double rhombus trademark. In terms of turnover, Horváth is the fourth largest business consultancy with German origin with last sales of 196 million euros.

Awards 
In the “Best of Consulting” competition run by the German economics magazine WirtschaftsWoche since 2010, Horváth were recognized for the eleventh time as one of the best management consulting firms in Germany in different categories.

For the seventh time in a row, Horváth took an undisputed first place in the category “Controlling and Finance” in the study “Hidden Champions of the Consulting Market” carried out by the Institute of Management and Consulting Sciences in 2019.

Literature 
Michael Buttkus, Ralf Eberenz: Performance Management in Retail and the Consumer Goods Industry. Springer 2019. - ISBN 978-3-030-12730-5 
Horváth: The Controlling Concept. Verlag Vahlen. ISBN 978-3-8006-5380-5

References

External links 

 
 Literature of and about Horváth  in the database of the German National Library

International management consulting firms
Consulting firms established in 1981
Management consulting firms of Germany
Companies based in Stuttgart